Robert Gordon Arthur (17 August 1909 – 9 June 1992) was an Anglican bishop in Australia. He was the Bishop of Grafton from 1961 to 1973.

Arthur was educated at Devonport High School for Boys and the University of Melbourne (BA 1930, MA 1934). From 1931 to 1949 he was a Methodist minister. He was ordained deacon and priest in 1949. After ordination he was a curate at St Saviour's Cathedral, Goulburn (1949-50), and then rector of Berridale (1950-53). After this he was rector of St John's, Canberra. He was later the Archdeacon of Canberra. From 1956 to 1961 he was an assistant bishop in the Diocese of Canberra and Goulburn. He was then Bishop of Grafton (1961-73).

On retirement from Grafton he became rector of St Philip's, O'Connor, (1973-74). and then Priest-in-Charge of Bratton Oratory (1975-78) and Rural Dean of Heytesbury (1976-77). His final ministry was as an assistant bishop in the Diocese of Sheffield (1978-80).

References

1909 births
People educated at Devonport High School for Boys
University of Melbourne alumni
Anglican archdeacons in Australia
Assistant bishops in the Anglican Diocese of Canberra and Goulburn
Anglican bishops of Grafton
20th-century Anglican bishops in Australia
1992 deaths